Scythris fasciatella is a moth of the family Scythrididae. It is found on the Canary Islands and in Spain.

The wingspan is about 10 mm.

References

Moths described in 1880
fasciatella